R. Narayana Murthy also known as People's Star(born 31 December 1954) is an Indian actor, screenwriter, director, composer, singer, and producer. He works predominantly in Telugu Cinema. He received Nandi Special Jury Award for his film Dandora (1993).

Murthy produces most of his films under the banner Sneha Chitra Pictures. He is known for left-oriented films that deal with the exploitation of society's lower strata. His films adopt themes like the atrocities of the upper classes against the helpless.  

His films address contemporary social problems such as unemployment, crony capitalism, problems in developing countries, environmental issues, dams and rehabilitation problems, land issues, political turmoil, etc. He starred in films such as Ardharatri Swaatantryam, Adavi Diviteelu, Laal Salaam, Dandora, Erra Sainyam, Cheemala Dandu, Dalam, Cheekati Suryudu, Ooru Manadiraa and Vegu Chukkalu.

Early life
Murthy was born on 31 December 1954 the village of Mallampeta of East Godavari district, Andhra Pradesh. He was schooled at Sankhavaram and moved to Chennai after completing his intermediate to pursue a career in films. He joined as a junior artist in the Krishna-starrer Neramu Siksha (1973) but on the advice of director Dasari Narayana Rao, he returned to studies and completed his BA in Peddapuram.

Career 
After completing his B.A. he went to Madras and met his guru and he played second lead in the film Needa. Murthy acted in Dasari's Sita Ramulu (1980),  Korikale Gurralaite, Vishwaroopam, K. Bapayya's Agni Poolu and Neramu Siksha. Dasari made him a full-fledged star with Sangeeta (1981) and Orey Rikshaw.

Murthy organized Ardharatri Swatantram as his first venture under his production house 'Sneha Chitra Pictures' in Rampachodavaram of East Godavari district on 10 June 1984. The film was released on 6 November 1986 on the eve of T. Krishna's death anniversary. T. Krishna played the role of a naxalite in that film. It was a hit and gave Murthy a reputation as a communist. From 1986 until 2018, he produced and directed 29 films on his Sneha Chitra Pictures banner. He had 15–20 years of success. Many of his films ran for silver jubilees (25 weeks) and golden jubilees (50 weeks).

Selected filmography

 Ardharatriswathantram (1986)
 Alochinchandi (1988)
 Bhooporatam (1989)
 Adavi Diviteelu (1990)
 Swatantra Bharatam (1991)
 Laal Salaam (1992)
 Dandora (1993)
 Erra Sainyam (1994)
 Cheemala Dandu (1995)
 Orey Rikshaw (1995)
 Errodu (1995)
 Aranyam (1996)
 Raitu Rajyam (1996)
 Dalam  (1997)
 Singanna (1997)
 Cheekati Suryulu (1998)
 Telugodu (1998)
 Koolanna (1999)
 Chalo Assembly (2000)
 Ooru Manadiraa (2002)
 Bheemudu (2003)
 Vegu Chukkalu (2003)
 Gangamma Jaatara (2004)
 Amma Meeda Ottu (2005)
 Adavi Biddalu (2006)
 Yeh Dharti Hamaari (2007; Hindi)
 Andamaina Manasulo (2008)
 Erra Samudram (2008)
 Devarakonda Veeraiah (2008)
 Veera Telangana (2010)
 Poru Telangana (2011)
 People's War (2012)
 Nirbhaya Bharatham (2013)
 Rajyadhikaram (2014)
 Dandakaranyam (2016)
 Head Constable Venkataramaiah (2017)
 Annadaatha Sukheebhava (2018)
 Raitanna (2021)

References

External links

Telugu film directors
Nandi Award winners
Filmfare Awards South winners
Living people
Male actors from Andhra Pradesh
People from East Godavari district
Indian male film actors
Film directors from Andhra Pradesh
20th-century Indian male actors
20th-century Indian film directors
Male actors in Telugu cinema
1954 births